XHGDL-FM is a radio station on 88.7 FM in Guadalajara, Jalisco, Mexico. It is operated by Grupo Radiorama and carries its Arroba FM pop format.

History
Despite receiving its concession on October 28, 1994 and signing on August 5, 1995, XEGDL has roots stretching to 1958, when Rodolfo Navarro Palomares was authorized to build XENP-AM 1320 in Ocotlán. XENP never made it to air, and by the time a concession was issued, the station was on 730 kHz in Guadalajara with its current callsign and owned by Hernández Campos.

In 2017, operation of XEGDL was taken over by Radiorama and the Arroba pop format was installed on the station, replacing its La Explosiva grupera format. On May 1, 2018, as part of second-wave AM-FM migration, XHGDL-FM 88.7 signed on the air.

References

1995 establishments in Mexico
Radio stations established in 1995
Radio stations in Guadalajara
Spanish-language radio stations